Fullrate A/S was a Danish lower-cost telecommunications flanker brand of YouSee, part of the TDC Group. Founded in 2005, by five former top-employees of Danish competitor Cybercity. Fullrate was founded after Cybercity's acquisition by Norway-based Telenor. Fullrate offers Internet access and phone services (VoIP), to customers all over Denmark.

Fullrate made use of the ADSL2+ with Annex M technology for their lowest-speed services, which enables download bandwidths up to 20Mbit/s and upload bandwidths up to 2Mbit/s. For speeds beyond that, VDSL2 is used 
with speeds up to 40 Mbit/s download and 8 Mbit/s upload speeds.

On 20 January 2020, TDC announced that Fullrate would be shut down by Spring 2020 and the customers be migrated to YouSee.

References

External links 
 Fullrate A/S

Telecommunications companies of Denmark